"What's Golden" is a song by the American hip hop group Jurassic 5 from their third studio album Power in Numbers. It features samples from Public Enemy's "Prophets of Rage" and Clive Hicks's "Look Hear."

It was also featured on ATV Offroad Fury 2. The song was additionally included in the video game Forza Horizon 3 on the fictional radio 'Block Party'.

Single track listing

Music video
The music video shows the band members, along with many unknown people, dancing in a hip hop club. All these people are later shown in a variety of urban settings (such as a cornfield, a bus, a dark alley, and the inner city) with Chali 2na, Mark 7even, Akil, and Soup rapping, seemingly oblivious to these settings.

Critical reception
Allmusic reviewer John Bush cited "What's Golden", along with "A Day at the Races" as "old-school anthems" among the darker songs elsewhere in the album.

Charts

References

Jurassic 5 songs
2002 singles
Interscope Records singles
2002 songs
Songs written by Chuck D
Songs written by Eric "Vietnam" Sadler